Anne Stuart (17 March 16375 November 1640) was the daughter of King Charles I and his wife, Henrietta Maria of France. She was one of the couple's three children to die in childhood.

Biography

Life 
Anne was born on 17 March 1637 at St. James's Palace, the sixth child and third daughter of King Charles I of England and his queen, Henrietta Maria of France. Her siblings were, in order of birth: Charles James, Duke of Rothesay and Cornwall (13 May 1629); the future Charles II of England; Mary, Princess Royal and future Princess of Orange; the future James II of England and Elizabeth of England. Anne was baptised an Anglican at St. James's Palace on 30 March, by William Laud, the Anglican Archbishop of Canterbury. Anne only lived to see the birth of two siblings: the short lived  Catherine (29 June 1639) and Henry Stuart, Duke of Gloucester. She died before the birth of her sister, Princess Henrietta of England, who married Philippe I, Duke of Orléans and had four children by him.

Death 
Aged just three, Anne died in 1640 from the lung disease tuberculosis. She was buried in Westminster Abbey, next to her brother Charles James.

Ancestors

Notes

References 

 
 

1637 births
1640 deaths
17th-century Scottish people
17th-century Scottish women
17th-century English women
People from Westminster
House of Stuart
English people of French descent
English princesses
Scottish princesses
17th-century deaths from tuberculosis
Tuberculosis deaths in England
Children of Charles I of England
Burials at Westminster Abbey
Royalty who died as children
Daughters of kings